Angelo Thomas Accera O.S.B. (November 7, 1925 – July 26, 1990) was a Catholic bishop who served the Archdiocese for the Military Services.

Biography
Born in Memphis, Tennessee, Accera entered the Benedictine order in 1944 at St. Bernard Abbey in Cullman, Alabama. He attended St. Benedict's College and was ordained to the priesthood on May 20, 1950. He obtained advanced degrees in canon law from Catholic University and the "Angelicum" in Rome. He was a member of the Catholic Theological Society of America.

He served for twenty years as a chaplain for the U.S. Air Force, retiring as a colonel. On September 29, 1983, Accerra was appointed titular bishop of Lete and auxiliary bishop of the Military Vicariate and was consecrated bishop on November 29, 1983. He was a member of the United States Conference of Catholic Bishops Ad Hoc Committee on the Moral Evaluation of Deterrence. Bishop Acerra died July 26, 1990, at his home in Alexandria, Virginia of lung cancer.

See also

 Historical list of the Catholic bishops of the United States
 Insignia of Chaplain Schools in the US Military
 List of Catholic bishops of the United States: military service
 Lists of patriarchs, archbishops, and bishops
 Military chaplain
 Religious symbolism in the United States military
 United States military chaplains

References

External links
 Archdiocese for the Military Services, USA, official website
 Archdiocese for the Military Services of the United States. GCatholic.org. Retrieved 2010-08-20.

1925 births
1990 deaths
People from Memphis, Tennessee
United States Air Force colonels
Chaplains
20th-century Roman Catholic bishops in the United States
Catholics from Tennessee
Deaths from lung cancer in Virginia